Final War or Final Wars may refer to:

Fiction
 Final War, a term used in Honorverse, a military science-fiction book series by David Weber
 The Final War, a 1959 Japanese science fiction film made by Toei (released in U.S. in 1962)
 Final War, a 1968 novelette by Barry N. Malzberg
 "Final Wars", a song by Buckethead from his 2006 studio album The Elephant Man's Alarm Clock
 Godzilla: Final Wars, a 2004 Japanese science-fiction kaiju film directed by Ryuhei Kitamura

History
 War of Actium, the final war of the Roman Republic
 Byzantine–Sasanian War of 602–628, the last war between the Byzantine Empire and Persia
 World War I, The War to End All Wars, or the Great War